"Shiver"  is a maxi-single by the Japanese rock band, The Gazette. It was released on July 21, 2010 in three editions; the "Optical Impression" edition, "Auditory Impression" edition, and "Kuroshitsuji II: Limited Edition", the first coming with a DVD containing the music video and making for the song "Shiver", and the second with a bonus track, and the third which contains the TV version of the song and the DVD which is the opening clip.

Track listing

Shiver: Optical Impression-
Disk one
 "Shiver" - 4:10
 "Hesitating Means Death" - 3:38
Disc two (DVD)
 "Shiver: Music Clip + Making" – 8:38

Shiver: Auditory Impression
 "Shiver" - 4:10
 "Hesitating Means Death" - 3:38
 "Naraku" (奈落) – 4:16

Kuroshitsuji II: Limited Edition
Disk one
 "Shiver" - 4:10
 "Shiver TV version" - 1:30
Disc two (DVD)
 "Kuroshitsuji Opening Video"

References

2010 singles
The Gazette (band) songs
2010 songs